Ľudovít Plachetka (born 27 March 1971) is a Slovak boxer. He competed in the men's middleweight event at the 1996 Summer Olympics. In 1998, he was convicted of murder, and served nine years of a thirteen-year prison sentence. In 2012, he was found guilty of rape, and was sentenced to a further eight years in jail.

He has won one professional fight.

References

External links
 

1971 births
Living people
Slovak male boxers
Olympic boxers of the Czech Republic
Boxers at the 1996 Summer Olympics
People from Gelnica
Sportspeople from the Košice Region
Slovak criminals
Slovak people convicted of murder
Czechoslovak people convicted of rape
Middleweight boxers